The Pelican River is an  tributary of the Otter Tail River of Minnesota in the United States.

Pelican River is an English translation of the native Ojibwe language name.

See also
List of rivers of Minnesota

References

Minnesota Watersheds

USGS Hydrologic Unit Map - State of Minnesota (1974)

Rivers of Becker County, Minnesota
Rivers of Otter Tail County, Minnesota
Rivers of Minnesota